Greenwoodella is an extinct genus of prehistoric bony fish.

References

External links
 Bony fish in the online Sepkoski Database

Crossognathiformes
Prehistoric ray-finned fish genera
Cretaceous bony fish
Early Cretaceous fish